Hemiargus is a genus of butterflies in the family Lycaenidae found in North and South America.

Species
Listed alphabetically:
 Hemiargus ceraunus (Fabricius, 1793) – Ceraunus blue
 Hemiargus hanno (Stoll, [1790])
 Hemiargus ramon (Dognin, 1887) – Ramon's blue
 Hemiargus huntingtoni Rindge & Comstock, 1953
 Hemiargus martha (Dognin, 1887)

References

Polyommatini
Lycaenidae genera
Butterflies of North America
Lycaenidae of South America
Taxa named by Jacob Hübner